The Wisconsin–La Crosse Eagles football program is the intercollegiate American football team for the University of Wisconsin–La Crosse located in La Crosse, Wisconsin. Wisconsin–La Crosse competes at the NCAA Division III level and is a member of the Wisconsin Intercollegiate Athletic Conference (WIAC). The Eagles play their home games at Veterans Memorial Stadium. Wisconsin–La Crosse has won three national titles: the NAIA Division II Football National Championship in 1985 and the NCAA Division III Football Championship in 1992 and 1995, all during the tenure of Roger Harring, who served as head coach from 1969 to 1999 and was inducted into the College Football Hall of Fame in 2005.

Wisconsin–La Crosse's teams were known as the Indians from 1937 to 1989. The name was changed because of concerns of racial insensitivity regarding Native Americans; see Native American mascot controversy.

Head coaching history 
Wisconsin–La Crosse has had 14 head coaches in their history.  No teams were fielded in 1943 or 1944 due to World War II.  Additionally, no team was fielded in 2020 due to the COVID-19 pandemic.

Championships

Conference championships 
Wisconsin–La Crosse has won the Wisconsin Intercollegiate Athletic Conference (WIAC) championship 34 times (16 outright, 18 shared).

† Co-champions

‡ The official record book does not reflect the game against the University of Wisconsin–Superior Yellowjackets scheduled for week 4 in 1992.  After completing their non-conference schedule, Wisconsin–Superior suspended it's season prior to conference play, before eventually dropping the football program altogether.  The scheduled game officially went down in the record books as "cancelled" as opposed to a "forfeit".  Superior hadn't beaten La Crosse since 1970.  The Eagles were looking to extend their 21 game winning streak against the Yellowjackets prior to the cancellation.

* On October 7th, 1992 Roger Harring suffered a heart attack that sidelined him for the remainder of the 1992 season. During Coach Harring's recovery, longtime Defensive Coordinator Roland Christensen took over as Interim Head Coach for the rest of the season, including the playoffs.

National championship games 
Wisconsin–La Crosse has played in three NAIA Division II Football National Championship games (winning 1, losing 2), and two NCAA Division III Football Championship games (winning both).

Undefeated regular seasons 
Wisconsin–La Crosse has finished the regular season undefeated ten times. Of the undefeated seasons, five (1918, 1927, 1932, 1940, 1942) were before playoffs existed. Two undefeated seasons (1950, 1953) resulted in invitations to the Cigar Bowl. In the playoff era, the Eagles finished the regular season undefeated three times (1992, 1993, 1995), winning the National Championship in 1992 and 1995, and losing in the quarterfinals in 1993.

Postseason games

Bowl games
Before there were tournaments to crown a national champion, Wisconsin–La Crosse (then La Crosse State) played in the Cigar Bowl twice, winning once and tying once.

NAIA Division I playoffs 
Wisconsin–La Crosse participated in the NAIA Division I playoffs on two occasions, finishing with an 0–2 record.

NAIA Division II playoffs 
Wisconsin–La Crosse was part of the NAIA Division II playoff field five times, reaching the championship game three times and winning the national championship once. In those five appearances they posted a 10–4 record.

NCAA Division III playoffs
The Eagles have found much of their post season success at the NCAA Division III level, making the tournament field 13 times, playing in the Stagg Bowl twice (winning both times) and compiling a 17–11 record.

Notable former players
Notable alumni include:
 Will Berzinski
 Roman Brumm
 George Dahlgren
 Brian Gutekunst
 Roger Harring
 Don Kindt Jr.
 Craig Kusick Jr.
 Ace Loomis
 Mike Maslowski
 Ric Mathias
 Greg Mattison
 Tom Newberry
 Bill Schroeder
 Jeremy Unertl
 Joel Williams

References

External links
 

 
American football teams established in 1911
1911 establishments in Wisconsin